Ceryx anthraciformis is a moth of the  subfamily Arctiinae. It was described by Wallengren in 1860. It is found in South Africa.

References

Endemic moths of South Africa
Ceryx (moth)
Moths described in 1860